There have been three baronetcies created for persons with the surname Burdett, two in the Baronetage of England and one in the Baronetage of Ireland. As of 2008, two of the creations are extant while one is dormant.

Burdett baronets, of Bramcote (1619)

The Burdett Baronetcy, "of Bramcote in the County of Warwick" (Bramcote in the parish of Polesworth), was created in the Baronetage of England on 25 February 1619 for Thomas Burdett, Sheriff of Derbyshire from 1610 to 1611. He was a descendant of Robert Burdet, who had a grant of free warren in Seckington, Warwickshire in 1327. His son and heir Robert was born there in 1345. The manor then followed the descent of Bramcote in this family, until 1919, when the eighth Baronet sold the estate in lots. The manorial rights, attached to Seckington Hall Farm, were bought by Mr. Harry Arnold.

The first Baronet's son, Francis, the second Baronet, was High Sheriff of Derbyshire for 1649. He was succeeded by his son, Robert, the third Baronet, who sat as Member of Parliament for Warwickshire and Lichfield. His grandson, Robert, the fourth Baronet, succeeded at birth in May 1716, four months after the death of his grandfather. He represented Tamworth in the House of Commons. On his death in 1797 the title passed to his grandson, Francis, the fifth Baronet, who was a prominent reformist politician. Burdett married Sophia, daughter of the wealthy banker Thomas Coutts. He was succeeded by his only son, Robert, the sixth Baronet. He served as Sheriff of Derbyshire in 1848. He died unmarried in 1880 and was succeeded by his first cousin, Francis, the seventh Baronet. He was the son of William Jones Burdett, younger brother of the fifth Baronet. He was High Sheriff of Surrey in 1880 and was succeeded by his son from his second marriage, Francis, the eighth Baronet. On his death in 1951 the baronetcy became dormant.

The philanthropist Angela Burdett-Coutts, 1st Baroness Burdett-Coutts, was the youngest daughter of the fifth Baronet. The seat of the Burdett family was Foremarke Hall, Derbyshire.

Burdett baronets, of Bramcote (1619)
Sir Thomas Burdett, 1st Baronet, of Bramcote (1585–c.1647)
Sir Francis Burdett, 2nd Baronet (1608–1696)
Sir Robert Burdett, 3rd Baronet (1640–1716)
Sir Robert Burdett, 4th Baronet (1716–1797)
Sir Francis Burdett, 5th Baronet (1770–1844)
Sir Robert Burdett, 6th Baronet (1796–1880)
Sir Francis Burdett, 7th Baronet (1813–1892)
Sir Francis Burdett, 8th Baronet (1869–1951)
Sir Paul Andrew Burdett, 9th Baronet (born 1964)

Burdett baronets, of Burthwaite (1665)

The Burdett Baronetcy, "of Burthwaite (now Birthwaite Hall, Darton, near Barnsley, South Yorkshire) in the County of York", was created in the Baronetage of England on 25 July 1665 for Francis Burdett. His grandson, Hugh, the third Baronet, was Rector of Newington, Kent. He died childless in 1760 and was succeeded by his younger brother, Charles, the fourth Baronet. He was Collector of Customs at St. Augustine, Florida. He was succeeded by his eldest son, Charles, the fifth Baronet. He was a Lieutenant-Colonel in the 56th Regiment of Foot. He died unmarried in 1839 and was succeeded by his nephew, Charles, the sixth Baronet. He was the son of Captain Jerome Burdett, younger son of the fourth Baronet. The title descended from father to son until the early death of his great-grandson, Charles, the ninth Baronet, in 1940. The late Baronet was succeeded by his first cousin once removed, Henry, the tenth Baronet. He was the son of Reverend William Jerome Burdett, younger son of the sixth Baronet. As of 2017 the title is held by his grandson, Crispin, the twelfth Baronet, who succeeded his father in that year.

Burdett baronets, of Burthwaite (1665)
Sir Francis Burdett, 1st Baronet (1642–c.1719)
Sir Francis Burdett, 2nd Baronet (1675–1747)
Sir Hugh Burdett, 3rd Baronet (1715–1760)
Sir Charles Burdett, 4th Baronet (1728–1803)
Sir Charles Wyndham Burdett, 5th Baronet (1771–1839)
Sir Charles Wentworth Burdett, 6th Baronet (1806–1848)
Sir Charles Wentworth Burdett, 7th Baronet (1835–1890)
Sir Charles Grant Burdett, 8th Baronet (1875–1918)
Sir Charles Coventry Burdett, 9th Baronet (1902–1940)
Sir Henry Aylmer Burdett, 10th Baronet (1881–1943)
Sir Savile Aylmer Burdett, 11th Baronet (1931–2017)
Sir Crispin Peter Burdett, 12th Baronet (born 1967).

The heir presumptive is the current baronet's cousin, Jeremy Francis D'Arcy Burdett (born 1951).

Burdett, later Weldon baronets, of Dunmore (1723)
The Burdett, later Weldon Baronetcy, of Dunmore in the County of Carlow, was created in the Baronetage of Ireland on 11 July 1723. For more information on this creation, see Weldon baronets.

Notes

References 
Kidd, Charles, Williamson, David (editors). Debrett's Peerage and Baronetage (1990 edition). New York: St Martin's Press, 1990, 

 

Baronetcies in the Baronetage of England
Baronetcies in the Baronetage of Ireland
1619 establishments in England
1723 establishments in Ireland